Prince Don Bagrat de Bagration y de Baviera, also Prince Bagrat Bagrationi-Mukhraneli and Prince Bagrat Bagration-Moukhransky (12 January 1949 – 20 March 2017) was a member of the Bagration dynasty which once ruled the Kingdom of Georgia  and a relative of the royal family of Spain.

Background
He was born in Madrid, Spain on 12 January 1949 and named Bagrat Juan María de Fátima de Todos los Santos, the third child of Prince Irakli Bagration-Mukhrani (1909-1977) by his third wife, Infanta Doña María de las Mercedes de Baviera y Borbón (1911-1953), a niece of King Alphonso XIII of Spain. His godparents were Don Juan and Princess Doña Mercedes de Borbón-Dos Sicilias y Orléans, Count and Countess of Barcelona. His maternal great-grandfather was King Alfonso XII. Prince Jorge de Bagration, a Spanish race car driver and pretender to the throne of Georgia, was his elder half brother.

Although born in Tbilisi, his father left Georgia after completing his studies there, lived briefly in Italy and France, but acquired Spanish citizenship in 1947. His mother had been born in Madrid, and although part of her youth was spent in exile in the Basses Pyrenees of France, Bagrat was raised, along with Jorge and his elder sister Princess Mariam (born 1947), by his widowed father in Madrid and at the Palacio de Santillana del Mar in Santander.

He was a knight of the Sovereign Military Order of Malta (Spanish association, No. 21658 as decreed in the Magisterial Palace of Rome on 31 January 1980).

Life
Bagrat married Doña María del Carmen de Ulloa y Suelves (b. 6 May 1953) on 12 November 1976 at San Jerónimo el Real in Madrid. María del Carmen was the daughter of Gonzalo María de Ulloa y Ramírez de Haro, Marqués de Castro-Serna, Count de Adanero and of Doña María Josefa de Suelves y Ponsich. From this marriage were born:
H.R.H Prince Juan Jorge Bagration-Mukhransky, born on 18 August 1977 in Madrid; married Florianne del Rio Thorn in 2003, the couple divorced without descendants in 2008. Juan remarried, in 2014, the Georgian model H.R.H Princess Kristine Bagration-Mukhransky (née Dzidziguri) 
Princess Inés Bagration-Moukhransky, born on 4  December 1980 in Madrid.
The couple were divorced on 16 September 2005, and Bagrat remarried in a civil ceremony to Mme. Françoise Cazaudehore on 7 March 2009 in Saint Germain-en-Laye, France.

Ancestors

References

External links 
Bagrat, prince Bagration-Mukhransky
Irakly, prince Bagration-Mukhransky

1949 births
2017 deaths
House of Mukhrani
Grandees of Spain
Knights of Malta